Frontiers in Public Health is a multidisciplinary open-access journal that is published online by Frontiers Media. The journal covers “occupational, mental and reproductive health, medicine and social policy, epidemiology, rehabilitation, obesity, family and social issues, quality of life and public health education and promotion.” It is based in Switzerland.

References

External links
Official website
National Institutes of Health archive

Frontiers Media academic journals